Anarcho-communism, is a political philosophy and anarchist school of thought that advocates communism. It calls for the abolition of private property but retains personal property and collectively-owned items, goods, and services. It supports social ownership of property and direct democracy among other horizontal networks for the allocation of production and consumption based on the guiding principle "From each according to his ability, to each according to his needs". 

Some forms of anarcho-communism, such as insurrectionary anarchism, are strongly influenced by egoism and radical individualism, believing anarcho-communism to be the best social system for realizing individual freedom. Most anarcho-communists view anarcho-communism as a way of reconciling the opposition between the individual and society.

Anarcho-communism was first formulated as such in the Italian section of the International Workingmen's Association. The theoretical work of Peter Kropotkin took importance later as it expanded and developed pro-organizationalist and insurrectionary anti-organizationalist sections.  are the anarchist territories of the Makhnovshchina during the Russian Revolution, and those of the Spanish Revolution, most notably revolutionary Catalonia.

History

Forerunners 
The modern current of communism was founded by the Neo-Babouvists of the journal L'Humanitaire, who drew from the "anti-political and anarchist ideas" of Sylvain Maréchal. The foundations of anarcho-communism were laid by Théodore Dézamy in his 1845 work Code de la Communauté, which was formulated as a critique of Étienne Cabet's utopian socialism. In his Code, Dézamy advocated the abolition of money, the division of labour and the state, and the introduction of common ownership of property and the distribution of resources "from each according to their ability, to each according to their needs". In anticipation of anarchist communism, Dézamy rejected the need for a transitional stage between capitalism and communism, instead calling for immediate communisation through the direct cessation of commerce.

In the wake of the French Revolution of 1848, Joseph Déjacque formulated a radical form of communism that opposed both the revolutionary republicanism of Auguste Blanqui and the mutualism of Pierre-Joseph Proudhon. Déjacque opposed the authoritarian conception of a "dictatorship of the proletariat", which he consided to be inherently reactionary and counter-revolutionary. Instead, he upheld the autonomy and self-organisation of the workers, which he saw expressed during the June Days uprising, against the representative politics of governmentalism. Opposed not just to government, but to all forms of oppression, Déjacque advocated for a social revolution to abolish the state, as well as religion, the nuclear family and private property. In their place, Déjacque upheld a form of anarchy based on the free distribution of resources.

Déjacque particularly focused his critique on private commerce, such as that espoused by Proudhon and the Ricardian socialists. He considered a worker's right to be to the satisfaction of their needs, rather than to keep the product of their own labour, as he felt the latter would inevitably lead to capital accumulation. He thus advocated for all property to be held under common ownership and for "unlimited freedom of production and consumption", subordinated only to the authority of the "statistics book". In order to guarantee the universal satisfaction of needs, Déjacque saw the need for the abolition of forced labour through workers' self-management, and the abolition of the division of labour through integrating the proletariat and the intelligentsia into a single class. In order to achieve this vision of a communist society, he proposed a transitionary period of in which direct democracy and direct exchange would be upheld, positions of state would undergo democratization, and the police and military would be abolished. 

Déjacque's communist platform outlined in his Humanisphere preceded the program of the Paris Commune, and would anticipate the anarcho-communism later elaborated by Errico Malatesta, Peter Kropotkin and Luigi Galleani.

Formulation in the International Workingmen's Association 

The International Workingmen's Association (IWA) was established in 1864, at a time when a formalised anarchist movement did not yet exist. Of the few individual anarchists that were influential at this time, it was Pierre-Joseph Proudhon's conception of federalism and his advocacy of abstentionism that inspired many of the French delegates that founded the IWA and lay the groundwork for the growth of anarchism. Among the French delegates were a more radical minority that opposed Proudhon's mutualism, which held the nuclear family as its base social unit. Led by the trade unionist Eugène Varlin, the radicals advocated for a "non-authoritarian communism", which upheld the commune as the base social unit and advocated for the universal access to education. It was the entry of Mikhail Bakunin into the IWA that first infused the federalists with a programme of revolutionary socialism and anti-statism, which agitated for workers' self-management and direct action against capitalism and the state.

By this time, the Marxists of the IWA had begun to denounce their anti-authoritarian opponents as "anarchists", a label previously adopted by Proudhon and Déjacque and later accepted by the anti-authoritarians themselves. Following the defeat of the Paris Commune in 1871, the IWA split over questions of socialist economics and the means of bringing about a classless society. Karl Marx, who favoured the conquest of state power by political parties, banned the anarchists from the IWA. The anarchist faction around the Jura Federation resolved to reconstitute as their own Anti-Authoritarian International, which was constructed as a more decentralised and federal organisation. Two of the IWA's largest branches, in Italy and Spain, repudiated Marxism and adopted the anti-authoritarian platform were.

As a collectivist, Bakunin had himself opposed the abolition of exchange value associated with communism, which he considered to be an inherently authoritarian ideology. But with Bakunin's death in 1876, the anarchists began to shift away from his theory of collectivism and towards an anarchist communism. The term "anarchist communism" was first printed in 's February 1876 pamphlet, To manual workers, supporters of political action. Élisée Reclus expressed his support for anarchist communism the following month, at a meeting of the Anti-Authoritarian International in Lausanne. James Guillaume's August 1876 pamphlet, Ideas on Social Organisation, outlined a proposal by which the collective ownership of the means of production could be used in order to transition towards a communist society. Guillaume considered a necessary prerequisite for communism would be a general condition of abundance, which could set the foundation for the abandonment of exchange value and the free distribution of resources. This program for anarcho-communism was adopted by the Italian anarchists, who had already begun to question collectivism.

Although Guillaume had himself remained neutral throughout the debate, in September 1877, the Italian anarcho-communists clashed with the Spanish collectivists at what would be the Anti-Authoritarian International's final congress in Verviers. In October 1880, a Congress of the defunct International's Jura Federation adopted Carlo Cafiero's programme of Anarchy and Communism, which outlined a clear break with Guillaume's collectivist programme. Cafiero rejected the use of an exchange value and the collective ownership of industry, which he believed would lead to capital accumulation and consquently social stratification. Instead Cafiero called for the abolition of all wage labour, which he saw as a relic of capitalism, and for the distribution of resources "from each according to their ability, to each according to their needs".

Organizationalism vs. insurrectionarism and expansion 

At the Berne conference of the International Workingmen's Association in 1876, the Italian anarchist Errico Malatesta argued that the revolution "consists more of deeds than words" and that action was the most effective form of propaganda. In the bulletin of the Jura Federation, he declared, "the Italian federation believes that the insurrectional fact, destined to affirm socialist principles by deed, is the most efficacious means of propaganda".

As anarcho-communism emerged in the mid-19th century, it had an intense debate with Bakuninist collectivism and, within the anarchist movement, over participation in syndicalism and the workers' movement, as well as on other issues. So in "the theory of the revolution" of anarcho-communism as elaborated by Peter Kropotkin and others, "it is the risen people who are the real agent and not the working class organised in the enterprise (the cells of the capitalist mode of production) and seeking to assert itself as labour power, as a more 'rational' industrial body or social brain (manager) than the employers".

Between 1880 and 1890, with the "perspective of an immanent revolution", who was "opposed to the official workers' movement, which was then in the process of formation (general Social Democratisation). They were opposed not only to political (statist) struggles but also to strikes which put forward wage or other claims, or which were organised by trade unions." However, "[w]hile they were not opposed to strikes as such, they were opposed to trade unions and the struggle for the eight-hour day. This anti-reformist tendency was accompanied by an anti-organisational tendency, and its partisans declared themselves in favor of agitation amongst the unemployed for the expropriation of foodstuffs and other articles, for the expropriatory strike and, in some cases, for 'individual recuperation' or acts of terrorism."

Even after Peter Kropotkin and others overcame their initial reservations and decided to enter labor unions, there remained "the anti-syndicalist anarchist-communists, who in France were grouped around Sébastien Faure's Le Libertaire. From 1905 onwards, the Russian counterparts of these anti-syndicalist anarchist-communists become partisans of economic terrorism and illegal 'expropriations'." Illegalism as a practice emerged, and within it, "[t]he acts of the anarchist bombers and assassins ("propaganda by the deed") and the anarchist burglars ("individual reappropriation") expressed their desperation and their personal, violent rejection of an intolerable society. Moreover, they were clearly meant to be exemplary, invitations to revolt."

Proponents and activists of these tactics, among others, included Johann Most, Luigi Galleani, Victor Serge, Giuseppe Ciancabilla, and Severino Di Giovanni. The Italian Giuseppe Ciancabilla (1872–1904) wrote in "Against organization" that "we don't want tactical programs, and consequently we don't want organization. Having established the aim, the goal to which we hold, we leave every anarchist free to choose from the means that his sense, his education, his temperament, his fighting spirit suggest to him as best. We don't form fixed programs and we don't form small or great parties. But we come together spontaneously, and not with permanent criteria, according to momentary affinities for a specific purpose, and we constantly change these groups as soon as the purpose for which we had associated ceases to be, and other aims and needs arise and develop in us and push us to seek new collaborators, people who think as we do in the specific circumstance."

By the 1880s, anarcho-communism was already present in the United States, as seen in the journal Freedom: A Revolutionary Anarchist-Communist Monthly by Lucy Parsons and Lizzy Holmes. Lucy Parsons debated in her time in the United States with fellow anarcho-communist Emma Goldman over free love and feminism issues. Another anarcho-communist journal later appeared in the United States called The Firebrand. Most anarchist publications in the United States were in Yiddish, German, or Russian, but Free Society was published in English, permitting the dissemination of anarchist communist thought to English-speaking populations in the United States. Around that time, these American anarcho-communist sectors debated with the individualist anarchist group around Benjamin Tucker. In February 1888, Berkman left for the United States from his native Russia. Soon after he arrived in New York City, Berkman became an anarchist through his involvement with groups that had formed to campaign to free the men convicted of the 1886 Haymarket bombing. He, as well as Emma Goldman, soon came under the influence of Johann Most, the best-known anarchist in the United States; and an advocate of propaganda of the deed—attentat, or violence carried out to encourage the masses to revolt. Berkman became a typesetter for Most's newspaper .

According to the anarchist historian Max Nettlau, the first use of the term "libertarian communism" was in November 1880, when a French anarchist congress employed it to identify its doctrines more clearly. The French anarchist journalist Sébastien Faure, later founder and editor of the four-volume Anarchist Encyclopedia, started the weekly paper  (The Libertarian) in 1895.

Methods of organizing: platformism vs. synthesism 

In Ukraine, the anarcho-communist guerrilla leader Nestor Makhno led an independent anarchist army during the Russian Civil War. A commander of the Revolutionary Insurgent Army of Ukraine, Makhno led a guerrilla campaign opposing both the Bolshevik "Reds" and monarchist "Whites". The Makhnovist movement made various tactical military pacts while fighting various reaction forces and organizing an anarchist society committed to resisting state authority, whether capitalist or Bolshevik. After successfully repelling Austro-Hungarian, White, and Ukrainian Nationalist forces, the Makhnovists militia and anarchist communist territories in Ukraine were eventually crushed by Bolshevik military forces.

A group of exiled Russian anarchists attempted to address and explain the anarchist movement's failures during the Russian Revolution. They wrote the Organizational Platform of the General Union of Anarchists, which was written in 1926 by Dielo Truda ("Workers' Cause"). The pamphlet analyzes the fundamental anarchist beliefs, a vision of an anarchist society, and recommendations on how an anarchist organization should be structured. According to the Platform, the four main principles by which an anarchist organization should operate are ideological unity, tactical unity, collective action, and federalism. The Platform argues, "We have vital need of an organization which, having attracted most of the participants in the anarchist movement, would establish a common tactical and political line for anarchism and thereby serve as a guide for the whole movement".

The Platform attracted strong criticism from many sectors of the anarchist movement of the time, including some of the most influential anarchists such as Volin, Errico Malatesta, Luigi Fabbri, Camillo Berneri, Max Nettlau, Alexander Berkman, Emma Goldman, and Grigorii Maksimov. Malatesta, after initially opposing the Platform, later agreed with the Platform, confirming that the original difference of opinion was due to linguistic confusion: "I find myself more or less in agreement with their way of conceiving the anarchist organisation (being very far from the authoritarian spirit which the "Platform" seemed to reveal) and I confirm my belief that behind the linguistic differences really lie identical positions."

Two texts made by the anarchist communists Sébastien Faure and Volin as responses to the Platform, each proposing different models, are the basis for what became known as the organization of synthesis, or simply synthesism. Volin published in 1924 a paper calling for "the anarchist synthesis" and was also the author of the article in Sébastien Faure's  on the same topic. The primary purpose behind the synthesis was that the anarchist movement in most countries was divided into three main tendencies: communist anarchism, anarcho-syndicalism, and individualist anarchism, and so such an organization could contain anarchists of these three tendencies very well. Faure, in his text "Anarchist synthesis", has the view that "these currents were not contradictory but complementary, each having a role within anarchism: anarcho-syndicalism as the strength of the mass organizations and the best way for the practice of anarchism; libertarian communism as a proposed future society based on the distribution of the fruits of labor according to the needs of each one; anarcho-individualism as a negation of oppression and affirming the individual right to development of the individual, seeking to please them in every way. The Dielo Truda platform in Spain also met with strong criticism. Miguel Jimenez, a founding member of the Iberian Anarchist Federation (FAI), summarized this as follows: too much influence in it of Marxism, it erroneously divided and reduced anarchists between individualist anarchists and anarcho-communist sections, and it wanted to unify the anarchist movement along the lines of the anarcho-communists. He saw anarchism as more complex than that, that anarchist tendencies are not mutually exclusive as the platformists saw it and that both individualist and communist views could accommodate anarchosyndicalism. Sébastian Faure had strong contacts in Spain, so his proposal had more impact on Spanish anarchists than the Dielo Truda platform, even though individualist anarchist influence in Spain was less intense than it was in France. The main goal there was reconciling anarcho-communism with anarcho-syndicalism.

Gruppo Comunista Anarchico di Firenze pointed out that during the early twentieth century, the terms libertarian communism and anarchist communism became synonymous within the international anarchist movement as a result of the close connection they had in Spain (see Anarchism in Spain) (with libertarian communism becoming the prevalent term).

Spanish Revolution of 1936 

The most extensive application of anarcho-communist ideas happened in the anarchist territories during the Spanish Revolution.

In Spain, the national anarcho-syndicalist trade union Confederación Nacional del Trabajo initially refused to join a popular front electoral alliance, and abstention by CNT supporters led to a right-wing election victory. In 1936, the CNT changed its policy, and anarchist votes helped bring the popular front back to power. Months later, the former ruling class responded with an attempted coup causing the Spanish Civil War (1936–1939). In response to the army rebellion, an anarchist-inspired movement of peasants and workers, supported by armed militias, took control of Barcelona and large areas of rural Spain, where they collectivized the land. However, even before the fascist victory in 1939, the anarchists were losing ground in a bitter struggle with the Stalinists, who controlled the distribution of military aid to the Republican cause from the Soviet Union. The events known as the Spanish Revolution was a workers' social revolution that began during the outbreak of the Spanish Civil War in 1936 and resulted in the widespread implementation of anarchist and, more broadly, libertarian socialist organizational principles throughout various portions of the country for two to three years, primarily Catalonia, Aragon, Andalusia, and parts of the Levante. Much of Spain's economy was put under worker control; in anarchist strongholds like Catalonia, the figure was as high as 75%, but lower in areas with heavy Communist Party of Spain influence, as the Soviet-allied party actively resisted attempts at collectivization enactment. Factories were run through worker committees, and agrarian areas became collectivized and ran as libertarian communes. Anarchist historian Sam Dolgoff estimated that about eight million people participated directly or at least indirectly in the Spanish Revolution, which he claimed "came closer to realizing the ideal of the free stateless society on a vast scale than any other revolution in history". Stalinist-led troops suppressed the collectives and persecuted both dissident Marxists and anarchists.

Although every sector of the stateless parts of Spain had undergone workers' self-management, collectivization of agricultural and industrial production, and in parts using money or some degree of private property, heavy regulation of markets by democratic communities, other areas throughout Spain used no money at all, and followed principles in accordance with "From each according to his ability, to each according to his needs". One such example was the libertarian communist village of Alcora in the Valencian Community, where money was absent, and the distribution of properties and services was done based upon needs, not who could afford them.

Post-war years 
Anarcho-communism entered into internal debates over the organization issue in the post-World War II era. Founded in October 1935, the Anarcho-Communist Federation of Argentina (FACA, Federación Anarco-Comunista Argentina) in 1955 renamed itself the Argentine Libertarian Federation. The Fédération Anarchiste (FA) was founded in Paris on 2 December 1945 and elected the platformist anarcho-communist George Fontenis as its first secretary the following year. It was composed of a majority of activists from the former FA (which supported Volin's Synthesis) and some members of the former Union Anarchiste, which supported the CNT-FAI support to the Republican government during the Spanish Civil War, as well as some young Resistants. In 1950 a clandestine group formed within the FA called Organisation Pensée Bataille (OPB), led by George Fontenis. The Manifesto of Libertarian Communism was written in 1953 by Georges Fontenis for the Federation Communiste Libertaire of France. It is one of the key texts of the anarchist-communist current known as platformism.

The new decision-making process was founded on unanimity: each person has a right of veto on the orientations of the federation. The FCL published the same year . Several groups quit the FCL in December 1955, disagreeing with the decision to present "revolutionary candidates" to the legislative elections. On 15–20 August 1954, the Ve intercontinental plenum of the CNT took place. A group called  appeared, which was formed of militants who did not like the new ideological orientation that the OPB was giving the FCL seeing it was authoritarian and almost Marxist. The FCL lasted until 1956, just after participating in state legislative elections with ten candidates. This move alienated some members of the FCL and thus produced the end of the organization. A group of militants who disagreed with the FA turning into FCL reorganized a new Federation Anarchiste established in December 1953. This included those who formed L'Entente anarchiste, who joined the new FA and then dissolved L'Entente. The new base principles of the FA were written by the individualist anarchist Charles-Auguste Bontemps and the non-platformist anarcho-communist Maurice Joyeux which established an organization with a plurality of tendencies and autonomy of groups organized around synthesist principles. According to historian Cédric Guérin, "the unconditional rejection of Marxism became from that moment onwards an identity element of the new Federation Anarchiste". This was motivated in a significant part by the previous conflict with George Fontenis and his OPB.

In Italy, the Italian Anarchist Federation was founded in 1945 in Carrara. It adopted an "Associative Pact" and the "Anarchist Program" of Errico Malatesta. It decided to publish the weekly Umanità Nova, retaking the name of the journal published by Errico Malatesta. Inside the FAI, the Anarchist Groups of Proletarian Action (GAAP) was founded, led by Pier Carlo Masini, which "proposed a Libertarian Party with an anarchist theory and practice adapted to the new economic, political and social reality of post-war Italy, with an internationalist outlook and effective presence in the workplaces [...] The GAAP allied themselves with the similar development within the French Anarchist movement", as led by George Fontenis. Another tendency that did not identify either with the more classical FAI or with the GAAP started to emerge as local groups. These groups emphasized direct action, informal affinity groups, and expropriation for financing anarchist activity. From within these groups, the influential insurrectionary anarchist Alfredo Maria Bonanno will emerge influenced by the practice of the Spanish exiled anarchist José Lluis Facerías. In the early seventies, a platformist tendency emerged within the Italian Anarchist Federation, which argued for more strategic coherence and social insertion in the workers' movement while rejecting the synthesist "Associative Pact" of Malatesta, which the FAI adhered to. These groups started organizing themselves outside the FAI in organizations such as O.R.A. from Liguria, which organized a Congress attended by 250 delegates of groups from 60 locations. This movement was influential in the  movements of the seventies.

The International of Anarchist Federations (IAF/IFA) was founded during an international anarchist conference in Carrara in 1968 by the three existing European anarchist federations of France, Italy, and Spain as well as the Bulgarian federation in French exile. These organizations were also inspired by synthesist principles.

Contemporary times 
The synthesist Italian Anarchist Federation and the platformist Federation of Anarchist Communists continue to exist today in Italy, but insurrectionary anarchism continues to be relevant, as the recent establishment of the Informal Anarchist Federation shows.

In the 1970s, the French Fédération Anarchiste evolved into a joining of the principles of synthesis anarchism and platformism. Later the platformist organizations Libertarian Communist Organization (France) in 1976 and Alternative libertaire in 1991 appeared, with this last one existing until today alongside the synthesist Fédération Anarchiste. Recently, platformist organizations founded the now-defunct International Libertarian Solidarity network and its successor, the Anarkismo network, which is run collaboratively by roughly 30 platformist organizations worldwide.

On the other hand, contemporary insurrectionary anarchism inherits the views and tactics of anti-organizational anarcho-communism and illegalism. The Informal Anarchist Federation (not to be confused with the synthesist Italian Anarchist Federation, also FAI) is an Italian insurrectionary anarchist organization. Italian intelligence sources have described it as a "horizontal" structure of various anarchist terrorist groups, united in their beliefs in revolutionary armed action. In 2003, the group claimed responsibility for a bombing campaign targeting several European Union institutions.

Economic theory 

The abolition of money, prices, and wage labor are central to anarchist communism. With the distribution of wealth being based on self-determined needs, people would be free to engage in whatever activities they found most fulfilling and would no longer have to engage in work for which they have neither the temperament nor the aptitude.

Anarcho-communists argue that there is no good way of measuring the value of any person's economic contributions because all wealth is a common product of current and preceding generations. For instance, one could not measure the value of a factory worker's daily production without considering how transportation, food, water, shelter, relaxation, machine efficiency, emotional mood, etc., contributed to their production. To honestly give numerical economic value to anything, an overwhelming amount of externalities and contributing factors would need to be considered—especially current or past labor contributing to the ability to utilize future labor. As Kropotkin put it: "No distinction can be drawn between the work of each man. Measuring the work by its results leads us to absurdity; dividing and measuring them by hours spent on the work also leads us to absurdity. One thing remains: put the needs above the works, and first of all recognize the right to live, and later on, to the comforts of life, for all those who take their share in production.."

Communist anarchism shares many traits with collectivist anarchism, but the two are distinct. Collectivist anarchism believes in collective ownership, while communist anarchism negates the entire concept of ownership in favor of the concept of usage.

Gift economies and commons-based organizing 

In anthropology and the social sciences, a gift economy (or gift culture) is a mode of exchange where valuable goods and services are regularly given without explicit agreement for immediate or future rewards (i.e., no formal quid pro quo exists). Ideally, voluntary and recurring gift exchange circulates and redistributes wealth throughout a community and serves to build societal ties and obligations. In contrast to a barter or market economy, social norms and customs govern gift exchange rather than an explicit exchange of goods or services for money or some other commodity.

Traditional societies dominated by gift exchange were small in scale and geographically remote from each other. Market exchange dominated as states formed to regulate trade and commerce within their boundaries. Nonetheless, gift exchange continues to play an essential role in modern society. One prominent example is scientific research, which can be described as a gift economy. Contrary to popular conception, there is no evidence that societies relied only on barter before using money for trade. Instead, non-monetary societies operated primarily along the principles of gift economics, and in more complex economies, on debt. When barter occurred, it was usually between strangers or would-be enemies.

The expansion of the Internet has witnessed a resurgence of the gift economy, especially in the technology sector. Engineers, scientists, and software developers create open-source software projects. The Linux kernel and the GNU operating system are prototypical examples of the gift economy's prominence in the technology sector and its active role in using permissive free software and copyleft licenses, which allow free reuse of software and knowledge. Other examples include file-sharing, the commons, and open access. Anarchist scholar Uri Gordon has argued:

The interest in such economic forms goes back to Peter Kropotkin, who saw in the hunter-gatherer tribes he had visited the paradigm of "mutual aid".

Philosophical debates

Motivation 
Anarchist communists reject the belief that wage labor is necessary because people are selfish by human nature. Most would point to examples of humans being willing to sacrifice time or resources for others and believe that systems of wage labor and state taxation serve more to restrict that instinct to help others rather than ensuring a society continues to function. Anarcho-communists generally do not agree with the belief in a pre-set "human nature", arguing that human culture and behavior are primarily determined by socialization and the mode of production. Many anarchist communists, like Peter Kropotkin, also believe that the human evolutionary tendency is for humans to cooperate for mutual benefit and survival instead of existing as lone competitors, a position that Kropotkin argued for at length.

While anarchist communists such as Peter Kropotkin and Murray Bookchin believed that the members of such a society would voluntarily perform all necessary labor because they would recognize the benefits of communal enterprise and mutual aid, other anarchist communists such as Nestor Makhno and Ricardo Flores Magón argue that all those able to work in an anarchist communist society should be obligated to do so, excepting groups like children, the elderly, the sick, or the infirm. Kropotkin did not think laziness or sabotage would be a significant problem in an authentically anarchist-communist society. However, he did agree that a freely associated anarchist commune could, and probably should, deliberately disassociate from those not fulfilling their communal agreement to do their share of work. Peter Gelderloos, based on the Kibbutz, argues that motivation in a moneyless society would be found in the satisfaction of work, concern for the community, competition for prestige, and praise from other community members.

Freedom, work, and leisure 
Anarchist communists support communism as a means for ensuring the greatest freedom and well-being for everyone, rather than only the wealthy and powerful. In this sense, anarchist communism is a profoundly egalitarian philosophy.

Anarchist communism, as an anarchist philosophy, is against hierarchy in all its forms. Anarchist communists do not think anyone has the right to be anyone else's master or 'boss' as this concept of capitalism and the state implies authority over the individual. Some contemporary anarchist communists and advocates of post-left anarchy, such as Bob Black, reject the concept of work altogether in favor of turning necessary subsistence tasks into voluntary free play.

Kropotkin said that the main authoritarian mistakes in communist experiments of the past were their being based on "religious enthusiasm" and the desire to live "as a family" where the individual had to "submit to the dictates of a punctilious morality". For him, anarcho-communism should be based on the right of free association and disassociation for individuals and groups and on significantly lowering the number of hours each individual dedicates to necessary labor. He says that "to recognise a variety of occupations as the basis of all progress and to organise in such a way that man may be absolutely free during his leisure time, whilst he may also vary his work, a change for which his early education and instruction will have prepared him—this can easily be put in practice in a Communist society—this, again, means the emancipation of the individual, who will find doors open in every direction for his complete development".

Individualism and collectivism 
Some anarcho-communists and collectivist anarchists also reject individualism and collectivism as illusory concepts. They argue that individuals sacrificing themselves for the "greater", or being ruled by the "community" or "society", is not possible because society is composed of individuals rather than being a cohesive unit separate from the individual and argue that collective control over the individual is tyrannical and antithetical to anarchism. Others such as Lucien van der Walt and Michael Schmidt argue that "[t]he anarchists did not [...] identify freedom with the right of everybody to do exactly what one pleased but with a social order in which collective effort and responsibilities—that is to say, obligations—would provide the material basis and social nexus in which individual freedom could exist." They argued that "genuine freedom and individuality could only exist in a free society" and that in contrast to "misanthropic bourgeois individualism" anarchism was based in "a deep love of freedom, understood as a social product, a deep respect for human rights, a profound celebration of humankind and its potential and a commitment to a form of society where a 'true individuality' was irrevocably linked to 'the highest communist socieability'".

Egoist anarchist philosophical positions are essential in anarcho-communist insurrectionary anarchism. In the early 20th century, the Italian individualist anarchist Renzo Novatore advocated both revolution and anarcho-communism when he said, "revolution is the fire of our will and a need of our solitary minds; it is an obligation of the libertarian aristocracy. To create new ethical values. To create new aesthetic values. To communalize material wealth. To individualize spiritual wealth." From Stirnerist positions, he also disrespected private property when he said that "[o]nly ethical and spiritual wealth" was "invulnerable. This is the true property of individuals. The rest no! The rest is vulnerable! And all that is vulnerable will be violated!" This can also be seen in the contemporary writings of insurrectionary anarchism, as seen in the work of Wolfi Landstreicher, Alfredo Bonanno, and others. After analyzing insurrectionary anarcho-communist Luigi Galleani's view on anarcho-communism, post-left anarcho-communist Bob Black went as far as saying that "communism is the final fulfillment of individualism [...] The apparent contradiction between individualism and communism rests on a misunderstanding of both [...] Subjectivity is also objective: the individual really is subjective. It is nonsense to speak of 'emphatically prioritizing the social over the individual,' [...] You may as well speak of prioritizing the chicken over the egg. Anarchy is a 'method of individualization.' It aims to combine the greatest individual development with the greatest communal unity."

In the article by Max Baginski called "Stirner: The Ego and His Own", published in the American anarchist magazine Mother Earth, there is the following affirmation: "Modern Communists are more individualistic than Stirner. To them, not merely religion, morality, family and State are spooks, but property also is no more than a spook, in whose name the individual is enslaved—and how enslaved! The individuality is nowadays held in far stronger bondage by property, than by the combined power of State, religion and morality [...] The prime condition is that the individual should not be forced to humiliate and lower himself for the sake of property and subsistence. Communism thus creates a basis for the liberty and Eigenheit of the individual. I am a Communist because I am an Individualist. Fully as heartily the Communists concur with Stirner when he puts the word take in place of demand—that leads to the dissolution of private property, to expropriation. Individualism and Communism go hand in hand."

Property 

Anarchist communists counter the capitalist conception that communal property can only be maintained by force and that such a position is neither fixed in nature nor unchangeable in practice, citing numerous examples of communal behavior occurring naturally, even within capitalist systems. Anarchist communists call for the abolition of private property while maintaining respect for personal property. As such, the prominent anarcho-communist Alexander Berkman maintained that "The revolution abolishes private ownership of the means of production and distribution, and with it goes capitalistic business. Personal possession remains only in the things you use. Thus, your watch is your own, but the watch factory belongs to the people. Land, machinery, and all other public utilities will be collective property, neither to be bought nor sold. Actual use will be considered the only title-not to ownership but to possession. The organization of the coal miners, for example, will be in charge of the coal mines, not as owners but as the operating agency. Similarly will the railroad brotherhoods run the railroads, and so on. Collective possession, cooperatively managed in the interests of the community, will take the place of personal ownership privately conducted for profit."

Free association of communes as opposed to the nation-state 
Anarcho-communism calls for a decentralized confederal form in relationships of mutual aid and free association between communes as an alternative to the centralism of the nation-state. Peter Kropotkin thus suggested:

Opposition to patriotism 
Dr Rob Sparrow outlined four main reasons why anarcho-communists oppose patriotism:

 The belief in equality for all people
 The use of patriotism to subjugate the working class
 The association between patriotism and militarism
 The use of patriotism to encourage loyalty to the state

See also 

 Accumulation by dispossession
 Anarcho-communists (category)
 Autonomism
 Anarcho-syndicalism
 Communalism
 Communization
 Consensus democracy
 Council communism
 Democratic confederalism
 Direct democracy
 Free association (communism and anarchism)
 Gift economy
 Insurrectionary anarchism
 Libcom.org
 Libertarian Communism
 Libertarian Marxism
 Libertarian socialism
 Makhnovshchina
 Neozapatismo
 Outline of libertarianism
 Platformism
 Political views and activism of Rage Against the Machine
 Refusal of work
 Social anarchism
 Spanish Revolution of 1936
 Workers' council

Notelist

References

Bibliography

Further reading

External links 
 Anarkismo.net – anarchist communist news maintained by platformist organizations with discussion and theory from across the globe
 Anarchocommunism texts at The Anarchist Library
 Kropotkin: The Coming Revolution – short documentary to introduce the idea of anarcho-communism in Peter Kropotkin's own words

 Anarcho-communist theorist archives

 Alexander Berkman
 Luigi Galleani
 Emma Goldman
 Peter Kropotkin
 Ricardo Flores Magón
 Errico Malatesta
 Nestor Makhno
 Johann Most
 Wayne Price
 Lucien van der Walt

 
Communism
Anti-capitalism
Anti-fascism
Communism
Criticism of intellectual property
Economic ideologies
Far-left politics
Left-libertarianism
Libertarian socialism
Political ideologies
Social anarchism
Types of socialism